The Message in the Hollow Oak is the twelfth volume in the Nancy Drew Mystery Stories series.  It was written under the pseudonym Carolyn Keene and first published in 1935.

Plot summary – 1935 edition

Nancy Drew finds out that she has won a rather unusual prize in a contest, a piece of land in Canada.  She takes a trip, her first outside of the United States, to see what her new property looks like.

As she is traveling by train to Canada, she meets an author named Ann Chapelle.  Suddenly, the train crashes, and everything is thrown into confusion. Nancy and her two friends, Bess Marvin and George Fayne, are uninjured, but Chapelle is taken to a nearby hospital, gravely injured.  When Nancy and her friends find her, Miss Chapelle tells Nancy the reason she was going to Canada, and asks a favor of her—to give a message to Miss Chapelle's grandfather, and to a lost love whom she hasn't seen since she ran away from home some years ago.

Along with this request, Nancy also has another problem:  Two men have heard that there might be gold on Nancy's land, and are determined to get there first.

1972 revision

New York City detectives can't find a clue to a missionary's fortune, which is hidden in a hollow oak tree. Nancy goes to a burial site in Illinois that is connected to the mystery. She joins a college archeological dig and stays on site, in Illinois, near East Saint Louis. Criticisms include the unlikely scenario of allowing Nancy such access and activity on the dig since she is not enrolled in college and would not have skills or knowledge of the topic prior to her arrival.

References

External links
 

Nancy Drew books
1935 American novels
1935 children's books
1972 American novels
1972 children's books
Novels set in Illinois
Novels set in Canada
Grosset & Dunlap books
Children's mystery novels